Hedgehope may refer to:

Hedgehope, New Zealand: a village in Southland, New Zealand
Hedgehope Branch: a closed railway line to Hedgehope, New Zealand
Hedgehope Hill: a mountain in England near the Scottish border